Glenea rufuloantennata is a species of beetle in the family Cerambycidae. It was described by Stephan von Breuning in 1966. It is found in the Philippines.

References

rufuloantennata
Beetles described in 1966